Belgrave is both a surname and a given name. Notable people with the name include:

Surname
Barrington Belgrave (born 1980), English footballer
Charles Belgrave (1894–1969), British adviser to the rulers of Bahrain (1926-1957)
Elliott Belgrave (born 1931), Governor-General of Barbados and High Court Judge
James Belgrave (1896–1918), British World War I flying ace
John Belgrave (1940–2007), Chief Ombudsman of New Zealand (2003–2007)
Marcus Belgrave (1936–2015), American jazz trumpet player
Valerie Belgrave (1946–2016), Trinidadian artist and author

Given name
Belgrave Ninnis (1837–1922), Royal Navy surgeon and Arctic explorer 
Belgrave Edward Sutton Ninnis (1887–1912), Arctic explorer and member of 1911 Australasian Antarctic Expedition